Lake Muir National Park is a national park in Western Australia, located  south east of Perth to the south of Muirs Highway in the Shire of Manjimup.

Lake Muir and the Muir-Byenup System, a complex of lakes and wetlands, are located in Lake Muir Nature Reserve, which adjoins the park to the north. The Muir-Byenup system is a designated wetland of international importance under the Ramsar Convention. The lake and wetlands are part of the Warren River catchment.

Lake Muir National Park adjoins Mount Roe National Park to the east and south east, and Mount Frankland North National Park to the south.

See also
 List of protected areas of Western Australia

References

National parks of Western Australia
South West (Western Australia)
Jarrah Forest